Paragiopagurus is a genus of hermit crabs in the family Parapaguridae, that contains 25 species. Members of this genus live at depths from 116 to 2,067 meters.

Species 
 Paragiopagurus acutus (de Saint Laurent, 1972)
 Paragiopagurus atkinsonae Landschoff & Lemaitre, 2017
 Paragiopagurus bicarinatus (de Saint Laurent, 1972)
 Paragiopagurus boletifer (de Saint Laurent, 1972)
 Paragiopagurus bougainvillei (Lemaitre, 1994)
 Paragiopagurus diogenes (Whitelegge, 1900)
 Paragiopagurus fasciatus Lemaitre & Poupin, 2003
 Paragiopagurus hirsutus (de Saint Laurent, 1972)
 Paragiopagurus hobbiti (Macpherson, 1983)
 Paragiopagurus insolitus Lemaitre, 1997
 Paragiopagurus laperousei Lemaitre, 2013
 Paragiopagurus macrocerus (Forest, 1955)
 Paragiopagurus orthotenes Lemaitre, 2013
 Paragiopagurus oxychelos Lemaitre, 2013
 Paragiopagurus pacificus (Edmondson, 1925)
 Paragiopagurus pilimanus (A. Milne-Edwards, 1880)
 Paragiopagurus rugosus (de Saint Laurent, 1972)
 Paragiopagurus ruticheles (A. Milne-Edwards, 1891)
 Paragiopagurus schnauzer Lemaitre, 2006
 Paragiopagurus sculptochela (Zarenkov, 1990)
 Paragiopagurus trilineatus Lemaitre, 2013
 Paragiopagurus tuberculosus (de Saint Laurent, 1972)
 Paragiopagurus umbonatus Lemaitre, 2013
 Paragiopagurus ventilatus Lemaitre, 2004
 Paragiopagurus wallisi (Lemaitre, 1994)

References 

Hermit crabs
Terrestrial crustaceans